National Progressive Party ( Phak Xat Kao Na) was a political party in Laos in the 1950s. The party was founded in 1950.

In the August 1951 elections for the National Assembly of Laos, the party won 19 of 39 seats, which was considered a landslide victory; in 1955, won with 23 of 39 seats. The party's leader, Souvanna Phouma, became prime minister. 

In 1958, the party dissolved as it merged into a new party, the Lao People's Rally.

References
The Pathet Lao
World Statesmen: Laos

 

Defunct political parties in Laos
Political parties established in 1950
Political parties disestablished in 1958